Events from the year 1955 in art.

Events
January 21 – O. Winston Link starts a 5-year personal project to document steam operations on the Norfolk and Western Railway in the United States using flash photography.
January 26 – A trial establishes that the recently "restored" "medieval" frescoes in St. Mary's Church, Lübeck, were in fact newly painted by Lothar Malskat and an associate.
 March – A Photographer's Gallery is established in New York City by Roy DeCarava.
May 17 – The Clark Art Institute opens to the public in Williamstown, Massachusetts.
June 1 – Première of Billy Wilder's film of The Seven Year Itch featuring an iconic scene of Marilyn Monroe standing on a New York City Subway grating as her white dress (created by Travilla) is blown above her knees.
June 27 – Sir Jacob Epstein marries Kathleen Garman.
December – Iris Clert Gallery opens in the rue des Beaux-Arts, Paris, and its owner, Iris Clert, first meets Yves Klein.
date unknown
 Marcel Duchamp becomes a citizen of the United States.
 Pablo Picasso finishes painting his Les Femmes d'Alger ("The Women of Algiers") series (inspired by Delacroix), concluding with "Version O" which in 2015 will sell at a world record price for a painting at auction.
 British studio potter Alan Caiger-Smith establishes Aldermaston Pottery in England.
 Enrique Tábara obtains an Ecuadorian government scholarship to study in Spain.

Awards
 Archibald Prize: Ivor Hele – Robert Campbell Esq.

Works

 Michael Andrews – Four People Sunbathing (Arts Council England)
Pietro Annigoni – Portrait of Elizabeth II
 Balthus
 Girls on the Couch
 Nude Before a Mirror
 John Brack
 Collins St., 5 pm
 The Car
 Edward Burra – Izzy Orts
 Lucien Clergue – Trio des Saltimbanques (photograph)
 Carroll Cloar – My Father Was Big as a Tree
 Pompeo Coppini – Statue of George Washington (bronze, University of Texas at Austin)
 Salvador Dalí – The Sacrament of the Last Supper (National Gallery of Art, Washington, D.C.) (completed)
 Ben Enwonwu – Anyanwu (sculpture)
 Sir Jacob Epstein – Christ in Majesty (sculpture for Llandaff Cathedral)
 M. C. Escher – lithographs
 Compass Rose (Order and Chaos II)
 Convex and Concave
 Three Worlds
 Alberto Giacometti
 Diego (approximate date)
 Grande tête mince
 Oswaldo Guayasamín – El ataúd blanco
 Edward Hopper – South Carolina Morning
 Jasper Johns
 Flag
 White Flag
 Willem de Kooning
 Composition
 Woman as Landscape
 Woman-Ochre
 Lee Krasner
 Bald Eagle
 Color Totem
 L. S. Lowry (Tate collection)
 Industrial Landscape
 A Young Man
 René Magritte – The Mysteries of the Horizon
 Georg Mayer-Marton — Crucifixion (mosaic and fresco in Roman Catholic Church of Holy Rosary in Fitton Hill, Oldham, England)
 Henry Moore
 Upright Motive No. 1: Glenkiln Cross
 Wall Relief no. 1 (carved brick, Bouwcentrum, Rotterdam)
 Sidney Nolan – Ned Kelly
 Pablo Picasso – Don Quixote (sketch for Les Lettres Françaises, August)
 Robert Rauschenberg – Bantam
 Mark Rothko – Violet Center
 Charles Sheeler – The Web
 Hedda Sterne – New York, N.Y., 1955

Exhibitions
 January – The Family of Man, a photography exhibition curated by Edward Steichen, opens at the Museum of Modern Art, New York.
 October – First public exhibition of Yves Klein's monochrome oil paintings, at Club des Solitaires, Paris.
 November 3–December 18 – Stanley Spencer: a Retrospective Exhibition at the Tate Gallery, London.
 Le Mouvement at Galerie Denise René, Paris, popularizing kinetic art.
 Exhibition by London members of Groupe Espace, organized by Paule Vézelay at the Royal Festival Hall.

Births
January 15 – Andreas Gursky, German large format photographer
January 21 – Jeff Koons, American "kitsch" artist
February 2 – Madi Phala, South African artist (d. 2007)
March 10 – Mark Landis, American painter and art forger
March 24 – Beverly K. Effinger, American painter
July 29 – Dave Stevens, American illustrator and comics artist (d. 2008)
August 2 – PHASE 2 (Lonny Wood), American graffiti artist (d. 2019)
November 15 – Sergey Voychenko, Belarusian artist and designer (d. 2004)
 undated
 Manasie Akpaliapik, Canadian Inuit sculptor
 Mariana Cook, American portrait photographer
 Miroslav Grčev, Macedonian architect and graphic designer
 Jaume Plensa, Catalan sculptor
 Rebecca Salter, English printmaker and multimedia abstract artist, President of the Royal Academy
 Alexander Sokolov, sculptor working in Spain

Deaths
January 1 – Maria Bal, Polish model (b. 1879)
January 7 – Lamorna Birch, English painter (b. 1869)
February 11 – Olga Khokhlova, Russian-born ballet dancer and estranged wife of Picasso (b. 1891)
March 13 – Evie Hone, Irish painter and stained glass artist (b. 1894)
March 16 – Nicolas de Staël, Russian-born French impasto painter (b. 1914)
May 3 – Rudolf Schlichter, German painter (b. 1890)
May 10 – John Radecki, Polish-born Australian stained glass artist (b. 1865)
May 11 – Bradley Walker Tomlin, American painter (b. 1899)
May 23 – Auguste Chabaud, French painter (b. 1882)
June 1 – Antonio Dattilo Rubbo, Italian-born Australian painter and art teacher (b. 1870)
June 29 – Max Pechstein, German Expressionist artist (b. 1881)
August 17 – Fernand Léger, French artist (b. 1881)
September 19 – Carl Milles, Swedish sculptor (b. 1875)
September 27 – Leslie Garland Bolling, African American sculptor (b. 1898)
November 5 – Maurice Utrillo, French painter (b. 1883)
November 29 – Rene Paul Chambellan, American sculptor (b. 1893)
December 17 – Dorothea Sharp, English painter (b. 1874)
December 19 – Alexander Lubimov, Russian artist (b. 1879)
December 28 – Olive Edis, English photographer (b. 1876)

See also
 1955 in fine arts of the Soviet Union

References

 
Years of the 20th century in art
1950s in art

ru:1955 год в истории изобразительного искусства СССР